Facpi Point is a headland in the south-west of the island of Guam. It is three kilometers due west of Mount Lamlam, and five kilometers north of Umatac village. The point was designated a National Natural Landmark in 1972.  Facpi Point marks the southern end of Agat Bay, as well as an end point of the boundary between the villages of Agat and Umatac. A small islet, Facpi Island, is off the tip of the point.

References

National Natural Landmarks in Guam
Headlands of Guam
Agat, Guam
Umatac, Guam
Agat Bay